The 1927 Kentucky Wildcats football team was an American football team that represented the University of Kentucky as a member of the Southern Conference (SoCon) during the 1926 season. In their first season under head coach Harry Gamage, Kentucky compiled an overall record of 3–6–1 with a mark of 1–5 in conference play, placing 21st in the SoCon.

Schedule

References

Kentucky
Kentucky Wildcats football seasons
Kentucky Wildcats football